Mangelia lissa is an extinct species of sea snail, a marine gastropod mollusk in the family Mangeliidae.

Description
The length of the shell attains 8.1 mm, its diameter 3mm.

Distribution
Mangulis lissa was found in the Alum Bluff Group, Florida, USA. This means it's from the Miocene Epoch, between 23 mya and 5 mya.  

It lived among other Mollusk species there.

References

External links

lissa
Gastropods described in 1947